Branscomb Peak is a small snowy prominence of elevation , the highest point of the ridge that forms the top of the main west face of Vinson Massif in the Sentinel Range of the Ellsworth Mountains, Antarctica. It overlooks Jacobsen Valley to the northeast, Goodge Col to the north-northeast, the upper section of Branscomb Glacier to the west, and Roché Glacier to the south.

The peak was named by US-ACAN in 2006 in association with adjacent Branscomb Glacier.

Location
US mapping in 1961, updated in 1988.

See also
 Mountains in Antarctica

Maps
 Vinson Massif.  Scale 1:250 000 topographic map.  Reston, Virginia: US Geological Survey, 1988.
 Antarctic Digital Database (ADD). Scale 1:250000 topographic map of Antarctica. Scientific Committee on Antarctic Research (SCAR). Since 1993, regularly updated.

References
 Branscomb Peak. SCAR Composite Gazetteer of Antarctica.

Ellsworth Mountains
Mountains of Ellsworth Land
Four-thousanders of Antarctica